Spanair served to the following destinations at closure on 27 January 2012:

Africa
 Algeria
Algiers - Houari Boumedienne Airport
Oran - Oran Es Senia Airport
 Egypt
Cairo - Cairo International Airport
 Equatorial Guinea
Malabo - Malabo Airport
 Libya
Tripoli - Tripoli Airport 
 Mali
Bamako - Senou Airport
 Morocco
Nador - Nador International Airport
 Senegal
Dakar - Yoff Airport

Asia
 Israel
Tel Aviv - Ben Gurion International Airport

Europe
 Austria
Vienna - Vienna International Airport
 Belgium
Brussels - Brussels Airport
 Czech Republic
Prague - Ruzyne Airport
 Croatia
Zagreb - Pleso Airport
 Denmark
Copenhagen - Kastrup Airport
 France
Lyon - Lyon-Saint Exupéry Airport
Nice - Côte d'Azur Airport
Paris - Charles de Gaulle Airport
 Germany
Berlin - Berlin Tegel Airport 
Frankfurt - Frankfurt Airport
Munich - Munich Airport
Hamburg - Hamburg Airport
 Hungary
Budapest-Ferihegy Airport
 Ireland
Dublin - Dublin Airport
 Italy
Milan
Linate Airport
Malpensa Airport
Naples - Capodichino Airport
Turin - Caselle Airport
Palermo - Punta Raisi Airport
Rome - Leonardo da Vinci Airport
Venice - Marco Polo Airport
 Netherlands
Amsterdam - Schiphol Airport
 Poland
Warsaw - Frederic Chopin Airport
 Portugal
Faro - Faro Airport
Lisbon - Portela Airport
Oporto - Francisco de Sa Carneiro Airport
 Romania
Bucharest - Otopeni Airport
 Russia
Moscow
Domodedovo Airport
Sheremetyevo Airport
Saint Petersburg - Saint Petersburg Airport
 Serbia
Belgrade - Nikola Tesla Airport
 Spain
Alicante - Alicante Airport
Barcelona - Barcelona El Prat Airport Hub
Bilbao - Bilbao Airport
Girona - Girona-Costa Brava Airport 
Ibiza - Ibiza Airport
Lanzarote - Lanzarote Airport
Las Palmas - Gran Canaria Airport
Madrid - Barajas Airport focus city
Mahón - Mahon Airport
Málaga - Pablo Ruiz Picasso Airport
Palma de Mallorca - Son Sant Joan Airport
Santiago de Compostela - Santiago de Compostela Airport
Seville - San Pablo Airport
Tenerife
Tenerife South Airport
Tenerife North Airport
Valencia - Manises Airport
Valladolid - Valladolid Airport
Zaragoza - Zaragoza Airport
 Sweden
Stockholm - Stockholm-Arlanda Airport
 Switzerland
Geneva - Geneva Airport
Zurich - Zurich Airport
 Turkey
Ankara - Ankara Esenboğa Airport 
Istanbul - Istanbul Airport
 Ukraine
Kyiv - Boryspil Airport
 United Kingdom
Edinburgh - Edinburgh Airport
London
Gatwick Airport
London Heathrow Airport
Manchester - Manchester Airport

See also
 SAS Group destinations

References

Lists of airline destinations